The Hollidaysburg Area School District is a midsized, suburban public school district which is based in Hollidaysburg, Pennsylvania. It serves the boroughs of Duncansville, Hollidaysburg, and Newry, and the townships of Allegheny, Blair, Frankstown, and Juniata. 

According to 2010 local census data, it serves a resident population of 27,555.

In 2009, the district residents’ per capita income was $19,907, while the median family income was $44,181. In the Commonwealth, the median family income was $49,501 and the United States median family income was $49,445, in 2010.

Schools
The Hollidaysburg Area School District operates two secondary and three elementary schools, also controls other buildings.

 Hollidaysburg Area High School
 Hollidaysburg Area Junior High School
 Charles W. Longer Elementary School
 Foot of Ten Elementary School
 Frankstown Elementary School

Extracurriculars
The district offers an extensive variety of clubs, activities and various sports.

Sports
The District funds:

Boys
Baseball - AAA
Basketball -AAAA
Cross Country - AAA
Football - AAA
Golf - AAA
Indoor Track and Field - AAAA
Soccer - AAA
Swimming and Diving - AAA
Tennis - AAA
Track and Field - AAA
Wrestling	 - AAA

Girls
Basketball - AAAA
Cross Country - AAA
Golf - AAA
Indoor Track and Field - AAAA
Soccer (Fall) - AAA
Swimming and Diving - AAA
Softball - AAA
Girls' Tennis - AAA
Track and Field - AAA
Volleyball - AAA

Junior high school sports

Boys
Basketball
Football
Soccer
Track and Field
Wrestling	

Girls
Basketball
Soccer (Fall)
Softball
Track and Field
Volleyball

According to PIAA directory July 2012

References

External links
 Hollidaysburg Area School District
 Appalachia Intermediate Unit 8
 Greater Altoona Career & Technology Center

School districts in Blair County, Pennsylvania